Randalls Island is an island conjoined with Wards Island in New York City.

Randalls Island may also refer to:
 Randalls Island (Montana), an island in the Yellowstone River
 Randall Island, in Sacramento County, California